Charles Edmund Ford FRS FLS FZS (24 October 1912 – 7 January 1999) was a noted cytogeneticist.

Educated at Slough Grammar School, he graduated in botany from King's College London. He was made a Fellow of the Royal Society in 1965. He was also a Fellow of the Linnean Society of London and the Zoological Society of London

References

1912 births
1999 deaths
Alumni of King's College London
Fellows of the Royal Society
Fellows of the Linnean Society of London
Fellows of the Zoological Society of London